Cathedral of Saint Thomas may refer to:

India

Catholic
 St. Thomas Syro-Malabar Cathedral, Kalyan
 St. Thomas Cathedral, Balharshah
St. Thomas Cathedral, Pala
St Thomas Cathedral & Bishop House, Irinjalakuda

Anglican
 St. Thomas Cathedral, Mumbai

Orthodox Syrian
St. Thomas Cathedral, Thottamon, Kerala

Sri Lanka
 St. Thomas' Cathedral, Vaddukoddai

Venezuela
 St. Thomas Cathedral, Ciudad Bolívar

United States
Mar Thoma Shleeha Cathedral (Bellwood, Illinois)
Cathedral of Saint Thomas (Reno)